Wilkims Ochieng (born 15 February 2003) is a professional footballer who plays as a midfielder for Slovenian PrvaLiga side Koper. Born in Kenya, he has represented Belgium at youth international level.

Club career
Ochieng began his career with the youth academy of Mouscron before moving to Club Brugge in 2017, where he was later promoted to the senior team and signed a professional contract with the club on 24 January 2020. Ochieng made his debut for Brugge's reserve side, Club NXT, in the Belgian First Division B match against RWDM47 on 22 August 2020, which his side lost 2–0.

On 4 January 2023, Ochieng signed with Slovenian PrvaLiga side Koper until 2025.

International career 
Ochieng was capped for the Belgium under-16s in 2018, making four appearances and scoring one goal.

In November 2021, he was included in the provisional squad of the Kenya national football team for their 2022 FIFA World Cup qualification campaign.

Career statistics

References

2003 births
Living people
Footballers from Nairobi
Kenyan footballers
Belgian footballers
Association football wingers
Royal Excel Mouscron players
Club Brugge KV players
Club NXT players
FC Koper players
Challenger Pro League players
Slovenian PrvaLiga players
Belgian expatriate footballers
Belgian expatriate sportspeople in Slovenia
Expatriate footballers in Slovenia
Belgian people of Kenyan descent
Belgian sportspeople of African descent
Belgium youth international footballers